DCBC may stand for:
 Denton County Brewing Company, a craft beer brewery and taproom in Denton, Texas, United States of America
 Diver Certification Board of Canada
 District of Columbia Baptist Convention
 Darwin College Boat Club, a rowing club of Darwin College, Cambridge, England
 Davao Christian Bible Channel, a TV station in Davao City, Philippines
 Downing College Boat Club, a rowing club of Downing College, Cambridge, England